Lead climbing competitions at the 2018 IFSC Climbing World Cup were held at seven locations, from 6 July to 28 October 2018. The top three in each competition received medals, and at the end of the season, the overall winners were awarded trophies. The overall winners were determined based upon points, which athletes were awarded for finishing in the top 30 of each individual event. Jakob Schubert won the men's seasonal title, Janja Garnbret won the women's seasonal title, and Austria won the national team title.

Overall ranking 
An overall ranking was determined based upon points, which athletes were awarded for finishing in the top 30 of each individual event.

Men 
6 best competition results were counted (not counting points in brackets) for the IFSC Climbing World Cup 2018.

Women 
6 best competition results were counted (not counting points in brackets) for the IFSC Climbing World Cup 2018.

National Teams 
For National Team Ranking, 3 best results per competition and category were counted (not counting results in brackets).

Villars, Switzerland (6-7 July)

Men 
91 athletes attended the World Cup in Villars.

Women 
64 athletes attended the World Cup in Villars.

Chamonix, France (11-13 July)

Men 
111 athletes attended the World Cup in Chamonix.

Women 
92 athletes attended the World Cup in Chamonix.

Briançon, France (20-21 July)

Men 
84 athletes attended the World Cup in Briançon.

Women 
66 athletes attended the World Cup in Briançon.

Arco, Italy (27-28 July)

Men 
95 athletes attended the World Cup in Arco.

Women 
76 athletes attended the World Cup in Arco.

Kranj, Slovenia (29-30 September)

Men 
61 athletes attended the World Cup in Kranj.

Women 
47 athletes attended the World Cup in Kranj.

Wujiang, China (20-21 October) 
The Lead World Cup finals at Wujiang were cancelled because of bad weather. The women's final was being carried out when it started to rain and made the last few climbers slip off of wet holds. After many considerations and an appeal from the athlete's side, the finals for women and men (which had not been carried out) were cancelled. The winners of the event were then determined based on the results of the semifinals.

Men 
34 athletes attended the World Cup in Wujiang. The finals were cancelled, and the results of the previous round (semi-finals) counted as the final ranking.

Women 
35 athletes attended the World Cup in Wujiang. The finals were cancelled, and the results of the previous round (semi-finals) counted as the final ranking.

Xiamen, China (27-28 October)

Men 
32 athletes attended the World Cup in Xiamen.

Women 
35 athletes attended the World Cup in Xiamen.

References 

IFSC Climbing World Cup
2018 in sport climbing